Blind Spot is a 1958 British drama film directed by Peter Maxwell and starring Robert MacKenzie, Delphi Lawrence, Gordon Jackson, John Le Mesurier, and Michael Caine.

Plot
Laid up in a military hospital waiting for an operation, U.S. Army Captain Dan Adams, has lost his sight due to a head injury. While his doctors are waiting for his injury to heal before proceeding, Adams is driven off the base to a party but is dropped off at the wrong address.

Entering the house, he stumbles over a body and startles the killers Rushford and Schrieder. Realising Adams is blind, they knock him out and throw him down a flight of stairs. When Adams revives back in the same hospital, his tale of murder seems implausible, as no evidence of a crime is found, including the distinctive tie pin he says he found beside the body.

After an operation to regain his sight, Adams finds the tie pin in the lining of his jacket. He sets out to track down the killers, starting with visiting the house he had accidentally been taken to. There he meets June Brent and her father, and learns that the tie pin belonged to June's brother Johnny, who had died in a plane crash a year earlier. Although Mr Brent is antagonistic to any investigation, having suffered a nervous breakdown after Johnny's death, June wants to find out the truth. She introduces Adams to a friend of Johnny's, aircraft mechanic Chalky White, and they start to investigate. Dan becomes even more determined to find the truth when an attempt is made on his life. He begins to suspect that Johnny might have stumbled on a smuggling racket, and perhaps did not die in the crash after all. After another attempt on his life, and June's kidnapping, Adams finally finds the truth about the mysterious death and the smuggling operation.

Cast

 Robert MacKenzie as Captain Dan Adams
 Delphi Lawrence as Yvonne Dubar
 Gordon Jackson as "Chalky" White
 Anne Sharp as June Brent
 John Le Mesurier as Mr. Brent
 George Pastell as Schrieder
 Ernest Clark as F. G. Fielding
 Ronan O'Casey as Rushford
 Michael Caine as Johnny Brent
 John Crawford as Doctor
 Andrew Faulds as Police Inspector
 Robert Gallico as Lieutenant Kelly
 Arthur Lowe as Garage Mechanic (uncredited)

Production
Principal location photography for Blind Spot took place at Majestic Hotel, Kensington, London, England. Studio shots were completed at Walton Studios, Walton-on-Thames, Surrey, England.

Blind Spot is a remake of "Blackout", a British crime drama (1950 film), by the same producers, but a different director.

Critical reception
TV Guide gave Blind Spot one out of four stars, and wrote, "A few good turns, including the final chase, can't pep up a tired script;" while the Radio Times rated the film two out of five stars, calling it a "stolid British crime yarn."

The Movie Scene gave the film three out of five stars, noting, "Robert MacKenzie appeared to make only three movies yet going on what he does as Dan Adams in 'Blind Spot' makes me think he could have had a solid movie career...after a decent set up "Blind Spot" quickly unravels into an ordinary 1950s crime drama with nothing to make it stand out except that it features a young Michael Caine."

References

External links
 
 

1958 films
1958 drama films
British drama films
Films directed by Peter Maxwell
1950s English-language films
1950s British films